Posnjakite is a hydrated copper sulfate mineral. It was discovered in the Tungsten deposit of Nura-Taldy in Karaganda Region in Kazakhstan and described in 1967 by Aleksandr Ivanovich Komkov (1926–1987) and Yevgenii Ivanovich Nefedov (1910–1976) and named after geochemist Eugene Valdemar Posnjak (1888–1949).

Occurrence 
Posnjakite is an uncommon but widespread secondary mineral in the oxidised zone of copper sulfide deposits, which may be of post-mine formation.  It is associated with brochantite, langite, devilline, serpierite, woodwardite, wroewolfeite, aurichalcite, azurite, malachite and chalcopyrite.

References 

Copper(II) minerals
Sulfate minerals
Monoclinic minerals
Minerals in space group 7